Khorezmian may be:
Khorezmian language (Turkic)
Khorezmian language (Iranian)